Peniculimius acehi is a moth in the family Crambidae. It was described by Schouten in 1994. It is found on Sumatra.

References

Diptychophorini
Moths described in 1994